Criollismo is a literary movement that was active from the end of the 19th century to the beginning of the 20th century throughout Hispanic America. It is considered the Hispanic counterpart to American literary regionalism. Using a realist style to portray the scenes, language, customs and manners of the country the writer was from, especially the lower and peasant classes, criollismo led to an original literature based on the continent's natural elements, mostly epic and foundational. It was strongly influenced by the wars of independence from Spain and also denotes how each country in its own way defines criollo, which in Mexico refers to locally-born people of Spanish ancestry.

Notable criollista writers

Notable criollista writers and works include: Mariano Latorre, Augusto d'Halmar and Baldomero Lillo from Chile, Francisco Lazo Martí and Rómulo Gallegos's "Doña Bárbara" (1929) from Venezuela, José Eustasio Rivera's jungle novel "La vorágine" (1924) from Colombia; Horacio Quiroga (Uruguay-Argentina), Ricardo Güiraldes, Benito Lynch (Argentina), Mario Augusto Rodriguez (Panama), Mario Vargas Llosa and Manuel Gonzales Prada (Peru).

Criollismo in Chile

In Chile, the criollismo movement shifted the cultural focus from urban life to rural life, and incorporated the rural world into the formation of the national identity. Some of the most representative Chilean criollista works are Baldomero Lillo's novels Sub Terra and Sub Sole, Mariano Latorre's novels Zurzulita and Cuna de cóndores (Cradle of Condors), Federico Gana's novel Días de campo (Countryside Days) and Antonio Acevedo Hernández's plays Árbol viejo and Chañarcillo.

See also
 Costumbrismo
 Criollo people
 Literature of Latin America
 Chilean literature
 Música criolla
 Peruvian waltz

References